LUKoil-Avia is a Russian airline based at Moscow's Sheremetyevo Airport. Owned by the LUKoil conglomerate, LUKoil-Avia operates flights for LUKoil executives, whilst also operating general executive charter flights.

History
The airline was established on 27 September 1994.

Fleet
As of February 2021, the LUKoil-Avia fleet included:

 1 Falcon 900EX
 2 Mil Mi-8MTV-1
 1 Boeing 737-700 (BBJ) 
 1 Challenger 601-3R
 1 Falcon 7X
 2 Beechcraft King Air 350

References

External links

Airlines of Russia
Companies based in Moscow
Airlines established in 1994
Lukoil
1994 establishments in Russia